American activist and country artist Chely Wright has received nine awards and over 15 award nominations. She first was recognized for her work as a country performer. Wright won her first major award in 1994 from the Academy of Country Music, who voted her their Top Female Vocalist. In later years, she would nominated for two additional awards by the association. In similar vein, she received several nominations from the Country Music Association, including two nominations for the Horizon Award. In later years, she received recognition for her role as an LGBT activist. She has been nominated twice by GLAAD and won an activist award from the Family Equality Council.

Academy of Country Music Awards

!
|-
| 1994
| rowspan="3"| Chely Wright
| Top New Female Vocalist 
| 
| rowspan="3"| 
|-
| rowspan="2"| 1999
| Top Female Vocalist
| 
|-
| "Single White Female"
| 
|-
|}

American Legion Auxilary

!
|-
| 2003
| Chely Wright
| Woman of the Year
| 
| 
|-
|}

Black Tie Dinner

!
|-
| 2010
| Chely Wright
| Media Award
| 
| 
|-
|}

Country Music Association Awards

!
|-
| 1999
| rowspan="2"| Chely Wright
| rowspan="2"| Horizon Award
| 
| rowspan="3"| 
|-
| 2000
| 
|-
| 2001
| Hard to Be a Husband, Hard to Be a Wife"
| Vocal Event of the Year
| 
|-
|}

CMT Music Awards

!
|-
| 1999
| "Single White Female"
| Female Video of the Year
| 
| 
|-
| 2002
| "Jezebel"
| Fashion Video Plate Award
| 
| 
|-
|}

Country Weekly Awards

!
|-
| 2001
| "Hard to Be a Husband, Hard to Be a Wife"
| Best Collaborative Event
| 
| 
|-
| rowspan="2"| 2005
| "The Bumper of My SUV"
| Best Patriotic Song
| 
| 
|-
| rowspan="2"| Chely Wright
| rowspan="2"| Star with the Biggest Heart
| 
| rowspan="2"| 
|-
| 2006
| 
|-
|}

Emmy Awards

!
|-
| 2013
| Wish Me Away
| News & Documentary Emmy Award
| 
| 
|-
|}

Family Equality Council

!
|-
| 2014
| Chely Wright
| Outstanding Work as an LGBT Activist
| 
|
|-
|}

GLAAD Media Awards

!
|-
| 2011
| Lifted Off the Ground
| Outstanding Music Artist
| 
| 
|-
| 2013
| Wish Me Away
| Outstanding Documentary
| 
| 
|-
|}

Lambda Literary Awards

!
|-
| 2011
| Like Me: Confessions of a Heartland Country Singer
| Lesbian Memoir/Biography
| 
| 
|-
|}

Los Angeles Film Festival

!
|-
| 2012
| Wish Me Away
| Jury Prize for Best Documentary
| 
| 
|-
|}

National Association for Music Education

!
|-
| 2001
| rowspan="2"| Chely Wright
| Stand Up for Music Award
| 
| rowspan="2"| 
|-
| 2002
| FAME Award
| 
|-
|}

Outmusic Awards

!
|-
| 2010
| Chely Wright
| Vanguard Award
| 
| 
|-
|}

Palm Springs International Film Festival

!
|-
| 2012
| Wish Me Away
| Audience Award, Best Documentary
| 
| 
|-
|}

Philadelphia Q Fest

!
|-
| 2012
| Wish Me Away
| Jury Award, Best Documentary
| 
| 
|-
|}

People magazine

!
|-
| 2002
| Chely Wright
| 50 Most Beautiful People
| 
| 
|-
|}

San Francisco LGBT Festival

!
|-
| 2012
| Wish Me Away
| Outstanding Documentary Feature
| 
| 
|-
|}

Seattle LGBT Festival

!
|-
| 2012
| Wish Me Away
| Audience Award, Favorite Documentary Film
| 
| 
|-
|}

TNN/Music City News Awards

!
|-
| 1996
| Chely Wright
| Female Star of Tomorrow
| 
| 
|-
|}

References

External links
 Awards and nominations at Archive.org

Wright, Chely